The following outline is provided as an overview of and topical guide to Liechtenstein:

Liechtenstein is a tiny, doubly landlocked alpine country located in Western Europe, bordered by Switzerland to its west and by Austria to its east. Mountainous, it is a winter-sport destination. It is also a tax haven. Despite this, it is not heavily urbanised. Many cultivated fields and small farms characterise its landscape both in the north (Unterland) and in the south (Oberland). It is the smallest German-speaking country in the world.

General reference 

 Pronunciation:
 Common English country name:  Liechtenstein
 Official English country name:  The Principality of Liechtenstein
 Common endonym(s):  
 Official endonym(s):  
 Adjectival(s): Liechtenstein
 Demonym(s): Liechtensteiner
 Etymology: Name of Liechtenstein
 ISO country codes:  LI, LIE, 438
 ISO region codes:  See ISO 3166-2:LI
 Internet country code top-level domain:  .li

Geography of Liechtenstein 

Geography of Liechtenstein
 Liechtenstein is...
 a country
 an alpine country
 a landlocked country
 a doubly landlocked country
 a sovereign state
 a microstate
 a European microstate
 a landlocked country  and a European microstate
 Location:
 Northern Hemisphere and Eastern Hemisphere
 Eurasia
 Europe
 Central Europe
 Western Europe
 Time zone:  Central European Time (UTC+01), Central European Summer Time (UTC+02)
 Extreme points of Liechtenstein
 High:  Grauspitz 
 Low:  Rhine 
 Land boundaries:  76 km
 41 km
 35 km
 Coastline:  none
 Population of Liechtenstein: 35,365 (December 31, 2007)  – 204th most populous country
 Area of Liechtenstein: 160 km2
 Atlas of Liechtenstein

Environment of Liechtenstein 

 Climate of Liechtenstein
 Renewable energy in Liechtenstein
 Geology of Liechtenstein
 Protected areas of Liechtenstein
 Biosphere reserves in Liechtenstein
 National parks of Liechtenstein
 Wildlife of Liechtenstein
 Fauna of Liechtenstein
 Birds of Liechtenstein
 Mammals of Liechtenstein

Natural geographic features of Liechtenstein 
 Glacial alpine valley
 Alpine Rhine
 Mountains of Liechtenstein
 Rivers of Liechtenstein
 Eschnerberg
 World Heritage Sites in Liechtenstein: None

Demography of Liechtenstein 

Demographics of Liechtenstein

Regions of Liechtenstein 

Regions of Liechtenstein

Ecoregions of Liechtenstein 

List of ecoregions in Liechtenstein
 Ecoregions in Liechtenstein

Administrative divisions of Liechtenstein 

Administrative divisions of Liechtenstein
 Municipalities of Liechtenstein

Municipalities of Liechtenstein 

 Capital of Liechtenstein: Vaduz
 Cities of Liechtenstein

Government and politics of Liechtenstein 

Politics of Liechtenstein
 Form of government: parliamentary representative democratic monarchy
 Capital of Liechtenstein: Vaduz
 Elections in Liechtenstein

 Political parties in Liechtenstein
 Taxation in Liechtenstein
 2008 Liechtenstein tax affair

Branches of the government of Liechtenstein 

Government of Liechtenstein

Executive branch of the government of Liechtenstein 
 Head of state: Prince of Liechtenstein, Hans-Adam II
 Head of government: Prime Minister of Liechtenstein, Daniel Risch
 Cabinet of Liechtenstein

Legislative branch of the government of Liechtenstein 

 Landtag of Liechtenstein (unicameral)

Judicial branch of the government of Liechtenstein 

Court system of Liechtenstein
 Supreme Court of Liechtenstein (Oberster Gerichtshof)
 Princely Superior Court of Liechtenstein (Fürstliches Obergericht)
 Princely Court of Liechtenstein (Fürstliches Landgericht)

Foreign relations of Liechtenstein 

Foreign relations of Liechtenstein
 Diplomatic missions in Liechtenstein
 Diplomatic missions of Liechtenstein
 Liechtenstein–Switzerland relations
 Liechtenstein–United States relations

International organization membership 
The Principality of Liechtenstein is a member of:

Council of Europe (CE)
European Bank for Reconstruction and Development (EBRD)
European Free Trade Association (EFTA)
International Atomic Energy Agency (IAEA)
International Criminal Court (ICCt)
International Criminal Police Organization (Interpol)
International Federation of Red Cross and Red Crescent Societies (IFRCS)
International Olympic Committee (IOC)
International Red Cross and Red Crescent Movement (ICRM)
International Telecommunication Union (ITU)
International Telecommunications Satellite Organization (ITSO)

Inter-Parliamentary Union (IPU)
Organization for Security and Cooperation in Europe (OSCE)
Organisation for the Prohibition of Chemical Weapons (OPCW)
Permanent Court of Arbitration (PCA)
United Nations (UN)
United Nations Conference on Trade and Development (UNCTAD)
Universal Postal Union (UPU)
World Confederation of Labour (WCL)
World Intellectual Property Organization (WIPO)
World Trade Organization (WTO)

Law and order in Liechtenstein 

Law of Liechtenstein
 Constitution of Liechtenstein
 1862 Constitution of Liechtenstein
 Crime in Liechtenstein
 Human rights in Liechtenstein
 LGBT rights in Liechtenstein
 Recognition of same-sex unions in Liechtenstein
 Freedom of religion in Liechtenstein
 Law enforcement in Liechtenstein
 Capital punishment in Liechtenstein

Military of Liechtenstein 

Military of Liechtenstein
 Command
 Commander-in-chief: None, Defence is the responsibility of Switzerland
 Ministry of Defence of Liechtenstein: None, Defence is the responsibility of Switzerland
 Forces
None, Defence is the responsibility of Switzerland
 Military history of Liechtenstein
 Military ranks of Liechtenstein

Local government in Liechtenstein 

Municipalities of Liechtenstein

History of Liechtenstein 

History of Liechtenstein

Timeline of the history of Liechtenstein
Current events of Liechtenstein
 Military history of Liechtenstein

Culture of Liechtenstein 

Culture of Liechtenstein
 Architecture of Liechtenstein
 Castles in Liechtenstein
 Art in Liechtenstein 
 Art in Liechtenstein
 Cinema of Liechtenstein
 Literature of Liechtenstein
 Music of Liechtenstein
 Theatre in Liechtenstein
 Cuisine of Liechtenstein
 Liechtenstein wine
 Festivals in Liechtenstein
 Languages of Liechtenstein
 Media in Liechtenstein
 Television in Liechtenstein
 National symbols of Liechtenstein
 Coat of arms of Liechtenstein
 Flag of Liechtenstein
 National anthem of Liechtenstein
 People of Liechtenstein
 Pfadfinder und Pfadfinderinnen Liechtensteins
 Prostitution in Liechtenstein
 Public holidays in Liechtenstein
 Records of Liechtenstein
 Religion in Liechtenstein
 Buddhism in Liechtenstein
 Christianity in Liechtenstein
 Hinduism in Liechtenstein
 Islam in Liechtenstein
 Judaism in Liechtenstein
 Sikhism in Liechtenstein
 World Heritage Sites in Liechtenstein: None

Sports in Liechtenstein 

Sports in Liechtenstein
 Liechtensteiner National Badminton Championships
 Football in Liechtenstein
 Liechtenstein at the Olympics

Economy and infrastructure of Liechtenstein 

Economy of Liechtenstein
 Economic rank, by nominal GDP (2007): 147th (one hundred and forty seventh)
 Agriculture in Liechtenstein
 Banking in Liechtenstein
 National bank of Liechtenstein
 Communications in Liechtenstein
 Internet in Liechtenstein
 Companies of Liechtenstein
Currency of Liechtenstein: Frank/Franc
ISO 4217: SUS
 Energy in Liechtenstein
 Energy policy of Liechtenstein
 Oil industry in Liechtenstein
 Health care in Liechtenstein
 Mining in Liechtenstein
 Liechtenstein Stock Exchange
 Tourism in Liechtenstein
 Visa policy of Liechtenstein
 Transport in Liechtenstein
 Airports in Liechtenstein
 Rail transport in Liechtenstein
 Liechtenstein Bus
 Roads in Liechtenstein

Education in Liechtenstein 

Education in Liechtenstein

See also 

Index of Liechtenstein-related articles
List of Liechtenstein-related topics
List of international rankings
Member state of the United Nations
Outline of Europe
Outline of geography

Notes

References

External links 

www.liechtenstein.li - Official site by the Principality of Liechtenstein
 Tourism Liechtenstein - The official tourism page of Liechtenstein
 Kunstmuseum Liechtenstein - The national Gallery of Liechtenstein
 Hochschule Liechtenstein - University of Applied Sciences Liechtenstein
History of Liechtenstein: Primary documents
 
 Photos of Liechtenstein
 "Arukikata" Liechtenstein, Traveller's guide written in Japanese/English
Russian Portal about Principality of Liechtenstein
Harry's Mountain Walks in Liechtenstein The only English language guide to routes up and among Liechtensteins fabulous Alpine peaks; also available in German.
Sarah Lyall, "For Rent: One Principality. Prince Not Included." New York Times, 25 March 2003

 
 
Liechtenstein